Krzysztof Jasiński (born July 21, 1943, in Borzechów) is a Polish actor, TV and theatre director.

In 1966 he established the Theatre STU in Kraków.

Krzysztof Jasiński directed also many operas, including Rigoletto in the Grand Theatre in Poznań (2002) and Halka in the Kraków Opera (2004).

Filmography
1970 - Prom
1973 - Portraits from Cracow
1976 - Zaklęty dwór as Damazy Czorgut
1981 - W obronie własnej as Krzysztof
1982 - Wilczyca as Kacper Wosiński
1988 - Powrót do Polski as Ignacy Jan Paderewski
1989 - Kanclerz as Samuel Zborowski
1989 - Żelazną ręką as Samuel Zborowski
1990 - Kapitan Conrad as Apollo Korzeniowski Nałęcz
1991 - Kapitan Conrad (Joseph Conrad) (serial) as Apollo Korzeniowski
1994 - Legenda Tatr
2000 - Klasa na obcasach
2001 - Więzy krwi
2008-2009 - BrzydUla as Krzysztof Dobrzański

References

External links

Krzysztof Jasiński at the Culture.pl 

Polish film directors
Polish theatre directors
Polish television directors
Polish male actors
1943 births
Living people
Recipients of the Gold Medal for Merit to Culture – Gloria Artis
Recipients of the Gold Cross of Merit (Poland)
Commanders of the Order of Polonia Restituta